Nasrabad or Naserabad or Nasr Abad may refer to various places in Iran:

Alborz Province
 Naserabad, Alborz

Ardabil Province
 Nasrabad, Ardabil, a village in Meshgin Shahr County

Chaharmahal and Bakhtiari Province
 Naserabad, Chaharmahal and Bakhtiari, a village in Borujen County

East Azerbaijan Province
 Nasrabad, East Azerbaijan, a village in Hashtrud County

Fars Province
Nasrabad, Darab, a village in Darab County
Nasrabad, Eqlid, a village in Eqlid County
Naserabad (29°36′ N 51°41′ E), Kazerun, a village in Kazerun County
Naserabad (29°40′ N 51°34′ E), Kazerun, a village in Kazerun County
Nasrabad, Marvdasht, a village in Marvdasht County
Nasrabad, Neyriz, a village in Neyriz County
Nasrabad, Shiraz, a village in Shiraz County

Gilan Province
 Nasrabad, Gilan, a village in Rasht County

Golestan Province
 Nasrabad, Golestan, a village in Gorgan County

Hamadan Province
 Nasrabad, Hamadan, a village in Famenin County
 Naserabad, Hamadan, a village in Kabudarahang County
 Nasrabad, Malayer, a village in Malayer Province

Hormozgan Province
 Naserabad, Hormozgan, a village in Rudan County

Isfahan Province
 Nasrabad, former name of Sefidshahr, a city in Aran va Bidgol County
 Nasrabad, Isfahan, a city in Isfahan County
 Nasrabad, Kashan, a village in Kashan County
 Nasrabad, Khur and Biabanak, a village in Khur and Biabanak County
 Nasrabad, Nain, a village in Nain County

Kerman Province
 Nasrabad, Anbarabad, a village in Anbarabad County
 Naserabad, Bardsir, a village in Bardsir County
 Naserabad, Kahnuj, a village in Kahnuj County
 Nasrabad, Kerman, a village in Kerman County
 Naserabad, Shahdad, a village in Kerman County
 Naserabad, Narmashir, a village in Narmashir County
 Naserabad, Rigan, a village in Rigan County
 Naserabad-e Chah-e Malek, a village in Rigan County
 Naserabad-e Chahgavari, a village in Rigan County
 Nasrabad, Zarand, a village in Zarand County

Kermanshah Province
Nasrabad Seyyed Hatam, a village in Qasr-e Shirin County
Nasrabad-e Pasha, a village in Qasr-e Shirin County
Nasrabad-e Seyyed Ahmad, a village in Qasr-e Shirin County
Nasrabad Seyyed Ahmad, alternate name of Ney Pahn-e Abdollah, a village in Qasr-e Shirin County
Nasrabad-e Seyyed Khalil, a village in Qasr-e Shirin County
 Nasrabad Rural District (Kermanshah Province), in Qasr-e Shirin County

Khuzestan Province
 Naserabad, Khuzestan, a village in Hendijan County

Kohgiluyeh and Boyer-Ahmad Province
 Naserabad, Kohgiluyeh and Boyer-Ahmad, a village in Charam County

Kurdistan Province
 Naserabad, Kurdistan, a village in Dehgolan County

Lorestan Province
 Nasrabad, Lorestan

Markazi Province
 Nasrabad, Markazi, a village in Khomeyn County
 Nasrabad, Khondab, a village in Khondab County

Mazandaran Province
 Naserabad, Amol, a village in Amol County
 Naserabad, Mahmudabad, a village in Mahmudabad County
 Naserabad, Nowshahr, a village in Nowshahr County

North Khorasan Province
 Nasrabad, North Khorasan

Qazvin Province
 Naserabad, Abyek, Qazvin Province
 Naserabad, Qazvin
 Nasirabad, Qazvin

Razavi Khorasan Province
 Nasrabad, Razavi Khorasan, a city in Torbat-e Jam County
 Nasrabad, Bardaskan, a village in Bardaskan County
 Nasrabad, Chenaran, a village in Chenaran County
 Nasrabad, Firuzeh, a village in Firuzeh County
 Nasrabad, Khalilabad, a village in Khalilabad County
 Nasrabad, Khoshab, a village in Khoshab County
 Nasrabad, Khvaf, a village in Khvaf County
 Nasrabad, Mahvelat, a village in Mahvelat County
 Nasrabad, Mashhad, a village in Mashhad County
 Nasrabad, Razaviyeh, a village in Mashhad County
 Nasrabad, Binalud, a village in Nishapur County
 Nasrabad, Miyan Jolgeh, a village in Nishapur County
 Nasrabad-e Olya, a village in Nishapur County
 Nasrabad, Salehabad, a village in Torbat-e Jam County
 Nasrabad, Zaveh, a village in Zaveh County
 Nasrabad District

Sistan and Baluchestan Province
Naserabad, Abtar, a village in Iranshahr County
Naserabad, Howmeh, a village in Iranshahr County
Nasrabad-e Rutak, a village in Khash County
Naserabad-e Talarak, a village in Khash County

South Khorasan Province
 Naserabad (32°45′ N 59°24′ E), Birjand, a village in Birjand County
 Nasrabad, Khusf, a village in Khusf County
 Nasrabad, Jolgeh-e Mazhan, a village in Khusf County
 Nasrabad, Sarbisheh, a village in Sarbisheh County
 Nasrabad, Tabas, a village in Tabas County

Tehran Province
 Naserabad, Tehran

Yazd Province
 Nasrabad, Taft
 Nasrabad, Nir, a village in Taft County
 Nasrabad Rural District (Taft County)

Zanjan Province
 Naserabad, Khorramdarreh, a village in Khorramdarreh County
 Nasrabad-e Torpakhlu, a village in Zanjan County

See also
Naseerabad (disambiguation)
Nasirabad (disambiguation)